Essex South West was a constituency of the European Parliament located in the United Kingdom, electing one Member of the European Parliament by the first-past-the-post electoral system. Created in 1979 for the first elections to the European Parliament, it was abolished in 1994 and succeeded by the constituencies of Essex West and Hertfordshire East and Essex South.

Boundaries

On its creation in 1979, it consisted of the parliamentary constituencies of Basildon, Brentwood and Ongar, Chelmsford, Epping Forest, Harlow and Thurrock.

After the 1984 boundary changes based on the new UK parliamentary constituencies created in 1983, it consisted of Basildon, Billericay, Brentwood and Ongar, Castle Point, Chelmsford, Epping Forest, Harlow and Thurrock.

The constituency was abolished in 1994. Brentwood and Ongar, Chelmsford, Epping Forest and Harlow became part of Essex West and Hertfordshire East. Basildon, Billericay, Castle Point and Thurrock were now part of the new constituency of Essex South.

MEPs

Election results

References

External links
 David Boothroyd's United Kingdom Election Results 

European Parliament constituencies in England (1979–1999)
Political history of Essex
1979 establishments in England
1994 disestablishments in England
Constituencies established in 1979
Constituencies disestablished in 1994